The Mohammadia School of Engineers (abbreviated EMI) is the first to be established engineering school in Morocco. EMI was founded in 1959 by the King Mohammed V as Morocco's first polytechnic, it's the largest institution of higher education in technology and one of the leading technical schools in Morocco.

History

EMI became in 1982 under the order of the king Hassan II a school combining academic and military education in order to control the students promoting communism.
The new model set was following the establishment of the polytechnical school of Paris (École Polytechnique).

Special events

 First Computer in Morocco as a gift from the king Baudoin of the Belgians to EMI.
 First Internet node in Morocco introduced by EMI.
 First School to introduce in 2003 the Internet country code top-level domain ".ma".
 First School introducing the Electrical Engineering 's bachelor's degree.

Organization

After three years of academic studies and military training the students have to take an oath in front of his majesty the King of Morocco in order to get the 'Grandes Ecoles d'ingénieurs' degree,a Bac+5 in the French education System, and the equivalent of a master's degree . In the military side the students graduate as reserve Officers. The school consists of nine departments :

 Department of Civil Engineering
 Department of Computer Science
 Department of Electrical Engineering
 Department of Industrial Engineering
 Department of Mechanical Engineering
 Department of Mineral Engineering
 Department of Modelling and Scientific Computing
 Department of Networks & Telecommunications
 Department of Process Engineering

References

External links 

  Official website
 AIEM Europe web site

Engineering universities and colleges
Education in Morocco
Schools of informatics
Grandes écoles
Educational institutions established in 1959
Education in Rabat
Buildings and structures in Rabat
1959 establishments in Morocco
20th-century architecture in Morocco